"Mia", also known as ''Mía'' (stylized in upper case; English: "Mine") is a song by Puerto Rican rapper Bad Bunny featuring vocals from Canadian rapper Drake. The song was released through OVO Sound, Rimas Entertainment  and Warner Bros. Records on October 11, 2018 as the second single from his debut studio album, X 100pre (2018). It was written by Benito Martinez, Aubrey Graham, Edgar Semper Vargas, Elvin Peña, Francis Diaz, Henry Pulman, Luian Malave Nieves, Joseph Negron Velez, Noah Assad and Xavier Semper Vargas, and produced by DJ Luian and Mambo Kingz.

"Mia" peaked at number five on the US Billboard Hot 100, becoming Bunny's first top 10 single on the chart as a lead artist and Drake's 26th. The song also topped the charts in Spain, and reached the top 10 in Argentina, Canada, Colombia, El Salvador, Greece, Panama, Portugal, Romania, Switzerland and Venezuela; as well as the top 20 in France, Italy, Sweden and the United Kingdom; passing the billion view mark for its accompanying music video on March 21, 2020.

Background
On January 25, 2018, Bad Bunny teased the song and posted a snippet on Instagram. Shortly before the release of the song, Drake posted a picture of himself posing on the set of the video. It is the first song on which Drake sings entirely in Spanish.

Composition
According to the sheet music published on Musicnotes.com, "Mia" is composed in the key of F-sharp minor and set in a  time signature at a tempo of 80 beats per minute.

Music video
The song's accompanying music video was released on October 11, 2018 and was directed by Fernando Lugo.

Personnel
Credits adapted from Tidal.
 Greg Moffett – assistant mixing engineering
 Les Bateman – engineering
 Lindsay Warner – engineering
 David Castro – engineering
 Chris Athens – mastering
 Noah Shebib – mixing
 Noel Campbell – mixing

Charts

Weekly charts

Year-end charts

Decade-end charts

All-time charts

Certifications

Release history

See also
 List of number-one singles of 2018 (Spain)
 List of number-one Billboard Hot Latin Songs of 2018
List of Billboard number-one Latin songs of 2019
 List of Billboard Argentina Hot 100 top-ten singles in 2018

References

2018 singles
2018 songs
Bad Bunny songs
Drake (musician) songs
Number-one singles in Spain
Songs written by Drake (musician)
Warner Records singles
Spanish-language songs
Songs written by Bad Bunny
Songs written by Edgar Semper
Songs written by Xavier Semper